The Combined Medical Services Examination or the CMS Examination is conducted by the Union Public Service Commission for recruitment as Medical Officer in various organisations such as the Indian Ordnance Factories, Indian Railways, Municipal Corporation of Delhi, New Delhi Municipal Council functioning under the Government of India. The Notification for the examination is usually released in the month of April and examination is conducted in July. Successful candidates are admitted after an interview conducted by the UPSC for those having qualified the written examination.

Eligibility Criteria

 Nationality:- Citizen of India, Subject of Nepal or Bhutan and some Tibetan refugees, a person of Indian origin who has migrated from Pakistan, Burma, Sri Lanka or East African Countries of Kenya, Uganda, the United Republic of Tanzania, Zambia, Malawi, Zaire and Ethiopia or from Vietnam with the intention of permanently settling in India.
 Age:- Must not have attained the age of 32 years with relaxations for various categories like SC, ST & OBC.
 Educational Qualifications:- Passed the written and practical parts of the final MBBS Examination.

Scheme of Examination
There is an objective-type written examination with two papers of two hours duration, each carrying a maximum of 250 marks. This is followed by a Personality Test carrying 100 marks of candidates who qualify on the results of the written examination.

Paper I
Maximum Marks : 250

Paper II
Maximum Marks : 250 

Candidates who qualify in the written examination are called for an Interview/Personality Test to be conducted by the Union Public Service Commission which carries 100 marks.

See also

 List of Public service commissions in India

References

External links 
UPSC Website

Union Public Service Commission
Standardised tests in India
Healthcare in India